Entenmann is a surname of German origin, meaning "ducks man", referring to someone who keeps ducks. Notable people with the surname include:

Charles E. Entenmann (1929-2022), American executive
Mathias Entenmann (born 1981), German former rugby player
Willi Entenmann (1943-2012), German football coach and player

See also
Entenmann's, American baked goods company